The 13th Golden Melody Awards ceremony was held at the Chiang Kai-shek Cultural Center in Kaohsiung, Taiwan, on 4 May 2002.

References

External links
  13th Golden Melody Awards nominees
  13th Golden Melody Awards winners

Golden Melody Awards
Golden Melody Awards
Golden Melody Awards
Golden Melody Awards